Kleniewo  is a settlement in the administrative district of Gmina Opole Lubelskie, within Opole Lubelskie County, Lublin Voivodeship, in eastern Poland.

The settlement has a population of 5.

References

Kleniewo